The 2017–18 Navy Midshipmen women's basketball team represents the United States Naval Academy during the 2017–18 NCAA Division I women's basketball season. The Midshipmen, led by tenth year head coach Stefanie Pemper, play their home games at Alumni Hall and are members of the Patriot League. They finished the season 25–8, 13–5 in Patriot League play to finish in third place. They advanced to the championship game of the Patriot League women's tournament where they lost to American. They received an at-large bid to the Women's National Invitation Tournament where they lost to Virginia Tech in the first round.

Previous season
They advanced to the championship of the Patriot League women's tournament where they lost to Bucknell. They received an automatic bid to the Women's National Invitation Tournament they defeated George Washington in the first round before losing to Virginia Tech in the second round.

Roster

Schedule

|-
!colspan=9 style=| Non-conference regular season

|-
!colspan=9 style=| Patriot League regular season

|-
!colspan=9 style=| Patriot League Women's Tournament

|-
!colspan=9 style=| WNIT

Rankings
2017–18 NCAA Division I women's basketball rankings

See also
 2017–18 Navy Midshipmen men's basketball team

References

Navy
Navy Midshipmen women's basketball seasons
Navy
Navy
Navy